French people of note include:

Actors

A–C

Isabelle Adjani
Renée Adorée
Anouk Aimée
Flo Ankah
Arletty
Antonin Artaud
Fanny Ardant
Jeanne Aubert
Jean-Louis Aubert
Jean-Pierre Aumont
Claude Autant-Lara
Daniel Auteuil
Charles Aznavour
Brigitte Bardot
Emmanuelle Béart
Loleh Bellon
Jean-Paul Belmondo
François Berléand
Charles Berling
Adam Bessa
Suzanne Bianchetti
Juliette Binoche
Bernard Blier
Sandrine Bonnaire
Élodie Bouchez
Bourvil
Dany Boon
Angelique Boyer
Charles Boyer
Guillaume Canet
Capucine
Martine Carol
Leslie Caron
Isabelle Carré
Vincent Cassel
Jean-Pierre Cassel
Laetitia Casta
Robert Clary
Grégoire Colin
Marion Cotillard
Clotilde Courau
Darry Cowl

D–L

Béatrice Dalle
Lili Damita
Danielle Darrieux
Alain Delon
Danièle Delorme
Julie Delpy
Catherine Deneuve
Élisabeth Depardieu
Gérard Depardieu
Guillaume Depardieu
Patrick Dewaere
Arielle Dombasle
Michel Drucker
Morgane Dubled
Jean Dujardin
Anny Dupérey
Romain Duris
Nicolas Duvauchelle
Fernandel
Brigitte Fossey
Louis de Funès
Félicité Du Jeu
Jean Gabin
Julie Gayet
Annie Girardot
Judith Godrèche
Eva Green
Sacha Guitry
Isabelle Huppert
Irène Jacob
Claude Jade
Marlène Jobert
Valérie Kaprisky
Louise Labèque
Mélanie Laurent
Jean-Pierre Léaud
Virginie Ledoyen
Noémie Lenoir
Max Linder
Sheryfa Luna

M–Z

Marcel Marceau
Sophie Marceau
Jean Marais
Jean-Pierre Marielle
Olivier Martinez
Jean-Baptiste Maunier
Bernard Minet
Miou-Miou
Mistinguett
Yves Montand
Jeanne Moreau
Michèle Morgan
Musidora
Pierre Niney
Gérard Philipe
Michel Piccoli
Clémence Poésy
Alexia Portal
Yvonne Printemps
Marguerite Priola, stage name of Marguerite–Marie–Sophie Polliart
Pérette Pradier
Jérôme Pradon
Rachel pseudonym for Elisa-Rachel Félix
Gabrielle Réjane
Jean Reno
Marine Renoir
Pierre Richard
Sebastian Roché
Jean Rochefort
Béatrice Romand
Philippine de Rothschild
Nathalie Roussel
Michel Roux
Emmanuelle Seigner
 David Serero
Léa Seydoux
Delphine Seyrig
Simone Signoret
Audrey Tautou
Jean-Louis Trintignant
Marie Trintignant
Gaspard Ulliel
Michael Vartan
Hervé Villechaize
Lambert Wilson

Architects

Jacques-François Blondel
Germain Boffrand
Étienne-Louis Boullée
Salomon de Brosse
Libéral Bruant
Androuet du Cerceau family
Le Corbusier pseudonym for Charles Edouard Jeanneret (Swiss-born)
Philibert de l'Orme
Gustave Eiffel
Pierre François Léonard Fontaine
Ange-Jacques Gabriel
Charles Garnier
Tony Garnier
Hector Guimard
Villard de Honnecourt
Pierre Jeanneret (Swiss-born)
Henri Labrouste
Claude Nicolas Ledoux
Pierre Lescot
André Lurçat
Robert Mallet-Stevens
François Mansart
Jules Hardouin Mansart
Louis Métezeau
Michel Mimran (born 1954)
Jean Nouvel
Charles Percier
Claude Perrault
Dominique Perrault
Auguste Perret
Christian de Portzamparc
Jean Prouvé
Alain Provost
Henri Sauvage
Jacques-Germain Soufflot
Louis Le Vau
Eugène Viollet-le-Duc

Artists

Painters

Photographers

Yann Arthus-Bertrand
Brassaï born in Hungary
Henri Cartier-Bresson
Raymond Depardon
Robert Doisneau
Pierre Dubreuil
Jules Gervais-Courtellemont
Nadar
Willy Ronis

Sculptors

Frédéric Bartholdi
Antoine Bourdelle
Antonin Carlès
Jean-Baptiste Carpeaux
César
Antoine-Denis Chaudet
Camille Claudel
Paul Dubois
Raymond Duchamp-Villon
Alexandre Falguière
Jean-Antoine Houdon
René Iché
Antonin Idrac
Antonin Mercié
Hippolyte Moulin
Émile Louis Picault
Jean-Baptiste Pigalle
Antoine-Augustin Préault
Auguste Rodin
René Rozet
François Rude
Niki de Saint Phalle
Sacha Sosno
Marie-Renée Ucciani

Athletes

A–J

André the Giant, professional wrestler
Sarah Abitbol, pairs figure skater (with Stéphane Bernadis); World Figure Skating Championship bronze
Tariq Abdul-Wahad (born Olivier Saint-Jean), basketball player 
Luc Alphand, Alpine skier
Jacques Anquetil, cyclist
Jonathan Assous, France/Israel, defensive midfielder (Beitar Ramat Gan)
Fabien Barthez, football player and racing driver
 Elliot Benchetrit, tennis player
Brice Blanc, jockey
Marion Bartoli, tennis player
Fabrice Benichou, world-champion super bantamweight boxer
Stéphane Bernadis, pairs figure skater (with Sarah Abitbol)
Alain Bernard, Olympic swimmer
Serge Betsen, Cameroon-born French citizen, rugby player
Serge Blanco, Venezuela-born French citizen, rugby player
Jean Bloch, Olympic silver football player
Louison Bobet, cyclist
Surya Bonaly, figure skater
Sébastien Bourdais, Indycar driver
 Frédéric Bourdillon (born 1991), French-Israeli basketball player in the Israel Basketball Premier League
Andrée Brunet and Pierre Brunet, 1928 and 1932 Olympic skating gold medalists
Jean-Luc Cairon (born 1962), gymnast and coach
Alain Calmat, figure skater, Olympic silver, world championship gold, silver, two-time bronze
Philippe Candeloro, figure skater
Eric Cantona, football player
Georges Carpentier, world-champion boxer
Marcel Cerdan, world-champion boxer
François Cevert (born François Goldenberg), Formula One driver
Eugène Christophe, cyclist
Albert Clément (c. 1878–1907), motor racing driver
Robert Cohen, world-champion bantamweight boxer
Stéphanie Cohen-Aloro, tennis player
Eugène Criqui, world-champion boxer
Jean Cruguet, jockey of Seattle Slew
Richard Dacoury, basketball player
Pierre Darmon, tennis player, highest world ranking # 8
André Darrigade, cyclist
Mathieu Debuchy, football player
Émile Delahaye, race car pioneer
Marcel Desailly, Ghana-born French citizen, football player
Abou Diaby, football player
Boris Diaw, basketball player
David Douillet, judoka
Yves Dreyfus, épée fencer, Olympic bronze medal, French champion
Isabelle Duchesnay and Paul Duchesnay, ice dancers
 Alojzy Ehrlich, Poland, table tennis, 3x won silver and 1x won bronze in the World Championships, incarcerated by the Nazis in Auschwitz, represented France after 1945.
Andre Ethier, Major League Baseball outfielder for the Los Angeles Dodgers
Patrice Evra, football player for Monaco and Manchester United
André Fabre, horse trainer
Evan Fournier, basketball player
Laurent Fignon, cyclist
Jeremy Flores, surfer
Just Fontaine, football player
Jacques Fouroux, rugby union player and coach
 Jessica Fox (born 1994), French-born Australian, slalom canoer, Olympic silver (K-1 slalom), world championships bronze (C-1)
Myriam Fox-Jerusalmi, slalom canoer, Olympic bronze (K-1 slalom), five golds at ICF Canoe Slalom World Championships (two-time K-1, three-time K-1 team)
Pierre Galle, basketball player and coach
Pierre Gasly, racing driver currently competing in Formula One with Alpine F1 Team
Camille du Gast, race car driver
Lucien Gaudin, fencer
 Fabien Gilot, Olympic and world champion swimmer
Yoann Gourcuff, football player
Stéphane Haccoun, boxer
Rudy Haddad, soccer midfielder (Hapoel Ashkelon & U21 national team)
Alphonse Halimi ("la Petite Terreur"), world-champion bantamweight boxer
Marlène Harnois (born 1986), taekwondo practitioner
Thierry Henry, football player
Bernard Hinault, cyclist
Jaylen Hoard (born 1999), French-American basketball player for Hapoel Tel Aviv of the Israeli Basketball Premier League
Pierre Houseaux, triathlete
Cristobal Huet, hockey player
Constant Huret, cyclist
Olivier Jacque, motorcycle rider
Rene Jacquot, boxer, underdog who became world champion
Laurent Jalabert, cyclist
Max Jean, Formula One driver
Brian Joubert, figure skater
 Natan Jurkovitz (born 1995), French-Swiss-Israeli basketball player for Hapoel Be'er Sheva of the Israeli Basketball Premier League

K–Z

Jean-Claude Killy (born 1943), skier
Raymond Kopa, football player
Pascal Lavanchy, ice dancer (with Sophie Moniotte)
Suzanne Lenglen, tennis player
Alexander Lévy (born 1990), American-born professional golfer
Alexandre Lippmann (1881–1960), épée fencer, two-time Olympic champion, two-time silver, bronze
Bixente Lizarazu, football player
Sébastien Loeb (born 1974), rally driver and five-time champion
Jeannie Longo, cyclist
Mickaël Madar (born 1968), footballer 
André Mahé, cyclist
Claude Makélélé, football player
Laure Manaudou, swimmer
Amélie Mauresmo, tennis player
Kylian Mbappé, football player
Jacques Mayol, freediver
Jose Meiffret, cyclist
Éric Millot, figure skater
Alain Mimoun, athlete
Sophie Moniotte, ice dancer (with Pascal Lavanchy)
Carole Montillet, skier
Armand Mouyal (1925–1988), épée fencer, Olympic bronze, world champion
Moustapha N'Diaye (born 1984), basketball player
Alfred "Artem" Nakache  (1915–1983), swimmer, world record (200 m breaststroke), one-third of French two-time world record (3x100 relay team)
Claude Netter (1924–2007), foil fencer, Olympic champion, silver
Hellé Nice, pioneer female race car driver
Joakim Noah, NBA basketball player (Chicago Bulls)
Yannick Noah, tennis player
 Jacques Ochs (1883–1971), French-born Belgian artist and Olympic fencing champion
Micheline Ostermeyer, Olympic champion in discus and shot put, bronze in high jump
Frédéric Ouvret (born 1970), former professional footballer
Simon Pagenaud, Indy car driver
Tony Parker, Belgian-born French citizen, basketball player
Gwendal Peizerat, ice dancer
Marie-José Pérec, athlete
Mary Pierce, Canadian-born French citizen, tennis player
Stéphane Peterhansel, car and motor racer, nine-time Dakar Rally winner
Julien Pillet, fencer
Michel Platini, football player
Alain Prost, Formula One driver and four-time champion
Antoine Rigaudeau, basketball player
 Arthur Rozenfeld (born 1995), basketball player in the Israeli Basketball Premier League
 François Rozenthal (born 1975), ice hockey player
 Maurice Rozenthal (born 1975), ice hockey player
 Georges Stern (1882–1928), jockey
Jean Stern (1875–1962), épée fencer, Olympic champion
Léon Théry, race car driver
Marcel Thil, world-champion boxer
Christophe Tiozzo, world-champion boxer; brother of Fabrice Tiozzo
Fabrice Tiozzo, world-champion boxer; brother of Christophe Tiozzo
David Trezeguet, football player
Tristan Vautier, Indy car driver
Patrick Vieira, Senegal-born French citizen, football player
Richard Virenque, Morocco-born French citizen, cyclist
Roger Walkowiak, cyclist
Jean-Pierre Wimille, race car driver
Albert Wolff (1906–1989), French-born American Olympic fencer
Zinedine Zidane, football player

Authors

A–E

Marcel Achard
Alain-Fournier
Mathilde Alanic, novelist, short story writer
Olivier Ameisen
Alix André, romance novelist
Jean Anouilh, 20th-century dramatist
Guillaume Apollinaire
Louis Aragon
Marie Célestine Amélie d'Armaillé, writer, biographer, and historian
Antonin Artaud
Marcel Aymé
Jean-Louis Baghio'o
Honoré de Balzac, realist author
Henri Barbusse
Charles Baudelaire, 19th-century poet
Pierre Beaumarchais, comedy playwright
Simone de Beauvoir, 20th-century author
Dany Bébel-Gisler
Cyrano de Bergerac
Jean Bernabé
Georges Bernanos
Tristan Bernard
Maurice Blanchot
Stella Blandy
Antoine Blondin
Nicolas Boileau
Lucie Boissonnas, 19th-century author
Jacques-Bénigne Bossuet
Pierre Boulle
Fernand Braudel
André Breton
Retif de la Bretonne
Jean Anthelme Brillat-Savarin
Michel Butor
Albert Camus, existentialist author
Marie-Magdeleine Carbet
Louis-Ferdinand Céline, 20th-century author
Blaise Cendrars
Aimé Césaire, 20th-century poet
Nicolas Chamfort
Patrick Chamoiseau
René Char, 20th-century poet
Victorine Chastenay
François-René de Chateaubriand
Pierre Choderlos de Laclos
Emil Cioran
Fanny Clar, journalist and author
Paul Claudel
Jean Cocteau, 20th-century poet and playwright
Colette, 20th-century author
Henri Collomb, psychiatrist
Joséphine Colomb, 19th-century children's writer
Maryse Condé
Raphaël Confiant
Benjamin Constant
Tristan Corbière
Pierre Corneille, classicist playwright
Marquis de Custine, travel writer
Joseph Dallois
Myriam David, psychoanalyst
Jeanine Delpech, journalist, translator, novelist
Robert Desnos, 20th-century poet
Gisèle d'Estoc, writer, sculptor, and feminist
Charles Dezobry, historian and historical novelist
Denis Diderot
Clotilde Dissard, journalist and feminist
Alexandre Dumas, père, author
Alexandre Dumas, fils, playwright/author
Marguerite Duras, 20th-century novelist
Vanessa Duriès
Paul Éluard
Salvat Etchart

F–O

Frantz Fanon, 20th-century author, psychiatrist
Léon-Paul Fargue
Georges Feydeau
Marc Ferro
Amanda Filipacchi, novelist (French and U.S. citizenship, writes in English)
Alain Finkielkraut, essayist
Gustave Flaubert, realist author
Anatole France
Marie de France, poet
Romain Gary
Jean Genet
André Gide, Nobel Prize winner
Jean Giono
Jean Giraudoux
Françoise Giroud
Édouard Glissant
Edmond de Goncourt, writer, critic, and founder of the Académie Goncourt
Julien Gracq
Julien Green
Pierre Guyotat
Jean-Edern Hallier
Juliette Heuzey, novelist, biographer
Auguste Himly, historian
Victor Hugo, novelist, poet, and playwright
Joris-Karl Huysmans
Eugène Ionesco
Martine L. Jacquot
Marie-Reine de Jaham
Alain Jouffroy, poet, art critic, plastician
Fabienne Kanor
Jean de La Bruyère
Jean de La Fontaine
Pierre Choderlos de Laclos
Comte de Lautréamont (Isidore Ducasse)
Leconte de Lisle, parnassian poet
Alphonse de Lamartine
Jacques Lacan, psychoanalyst
Emmanuel Le Roy Ladurie, historian
Paul Lafargue
Jules Laforgue
Valéry Larbaud
Maurice Leblanc, created Arsène Lupin
Marie Léra, journalist, novelist, and translator
Gaston Leroux, journalist and author, credited with creating the locked room puzzle mystery novel Le Mystère de la chambre jaune (The Mystery of the Yellow Room) and author of Le Fantôme de l'Opéra (The Phantom of the Opera)Pauline de Lézardière, 18th-century historian
Stéphane Mallarmé, poet
Hector Malot, 19th-century author
André Malraux
Matthieu Marais, 18th-century lawyer and writer
Marcel Marceau, 20th-century mime (and member of the French Resistance in World War II)
René Maran
Pierre de Marivaux, playwright
Clément Marot, poet
Guy de Maupassant, novelist
François Mauriac, Roman Catholic writer
Daniel Maximin
Prosper Mérimée, 19th-century novelist
Catherine Millet, art expert, editor and erotic memoirist
Patrick Modiano
Jean Baptiste Poquelin dit Molière, 17th-century comedic playwright and actor
Alfred de Musset, 19th-century poet
Claire Julie de Nanteuil, 19th-century writer
Gérard de Nerval
Paul Niger
Anaïs Nin
Mona Ozouf, historian

P–Z

Marcel Pagnol
Gisela Pankow, psychoanalyst
Ève Paul-Margueritte, novelist
Lucie Paul-Margueritte, writer and translator
Charles Péguy, 20th-century poet
Charles Perrault, Mother Goose TalesGeorges Perec
Saint-John Perse
Roger Peyrefitte
Jean Piaget, psychologist
Jean Piat
Gisèle Pineau
Christine de Pizan, historian, poet, philosopher
Jacques Prévert, 20th-century poet
Abbé Prévost
Marcel Prévost
Marcel Proust, novelist
Raymond Queneau
François Rabelais, Renaissance writer
Raymond Radiguet
Jean Racine, classicist playwright
Pauline Réage, novelist
Gabrielle Réval, novelist and essayist
Arthur Rimbaud, symbolist poet
Alain Robbe-Grillet
Pierre de Ronsard
Edmond Rostand, neo-romantic playwright
Raymond Roussel
Maximilien Rubel
Marquis de Sade, erotic and philosophic author
Charles Augustin Sainte-Beuve
George Sand, feminist author
Jean-Paul Sartre, 20th-century existentialist philosopher
Nathalie Sarraute
André Schwarz-Bart
Simone Schwarz-Bart
Pierre Seel, homosexual survivor of the concentration camps, activist, author
Victor Segalen
Madame de Sévigné
Madame de Staël
Antoine de Saint-Exupery, author and aviator
Claude Simon
Stendhal, novelist (born Henry Beyle)
Alain Tasso, poet, painter, essayist, art critic, literary critic
Raphaël Tardon
Guy Tirolien
François Truffaut, 20th-century filmmaker
Paul Valéry, 20th-century poet
Vercors, pseudonym of Jean Bruller
Paul Verlaine, symbolist poet
Jules Verne, novelist
Boris Vian, 20th-century author
Alfred de Vigny, 19th-century poet
Auguste Villiers de l'Isle-Adam
François Villon
Voltaire
Myriam Warner-Vieyra
Marguerite Yourcenar
Joseph Zobel
Émile Zola, naturalist author

Aviators

Clément Ader
Jacqueline Auriol
Louis Blériot
Henri Farman
René Fonck
Roland Garros, first to cross the Mediterranean; French Open is named after him.
Georges Guynemer
Raymonde de Laroche
Hubert Latham
Léon Lemartin
Marie Marvingt
Jean Mermoz
Les Frères Robert, balloonists Anne-Jean Robert and Nicolas-Louis Robert
Antoine de Saint-Exupéry, author and aviator
André Turcat
Gabriel Voisin

Business

Bernard Arnault (born 1949), entrepreneur
Marie-Claude Beaud (born 1946), museumist
Liliane Bettencourt, cosmetics
Marcel Bich (1914–1994), Bic pens
Vincent Bolloré (born 1952), transportation and engineering
Marcel Boussac, textiles, fashion, newspapers, race horse breeding
Anne Bouverot (born 1966), telecommunications business executive 
Ettore Bugatti (1881–1947), automobile manufacturer
André Citroën (1878–1935), automobile manufacturer
Adolphe Clément-Bayard (1855–1928), transportation manufacturer
Marcel Dassault (1892–1986), aviation
Alexandre Darracq (1855–1931), automotive pioneer
Claude Dauphin (born 1951), commodities trader
Pierre Dauzier (1939–2007), businessman, former president of Havas
Louis Delâge (1874–1947), automotive pioneer
Émile Delahaye (1843–1905), automotive pioneer
Gérard Louis-Dreyfus (1932–2016), agricultural commodities
Eleuthère Irénée du Pont de Nemours (1771–1834), founder of DuPont
Pierre Samuel du Pont de Nemours (1739–1817), entrepreneur
Jacques Foccart (?–1997), import-export
Léon Gaumont, pioneer film inventor
Paul-Louis Halley (1934–2004), supermarket tycoon
Max Hymans (1900–1961), aviation
Jean-Marie Messier (born 1957), former Vivendi CEO
Gérard Mestrallet (born 1949), chairman and CEO of Suez
Gérard Mulliez, entrepreneur
Xavier Niel (born 1967), entrepreneur and businessman at Iliad
Charles Pathé, film industry pioneer
Armand Peugeot (1849–1915), automobile manufacturer
François Pinault (born 1936), entrepreneur
Jacques-Donatien Le Ray de Chaumont (1726–1803), shipping magnate and a "Father of the American Revolution"
Marcel Renault (1872–1903), Co-founder of  automobile manufacturer Renault
César Ritz, hotelier
James Mayer de Rothschild (1792–1868), banker
Philippe de Rothschild (1902–1988), wine maker
Eugène Schueller (1881–1954), founder of L'Oréal
Bernard Tapie (born 1943), entrepreneur
Pierre Vidoue (c.1490–1543), Parisian printer and bookseller

Chefs

Raymond Blanc
Paul Bocuse
Daniel Boulud
Michel Bras
Pascal Caffet
Marie-Antoine Carême
Alain Ducasse
Adolphe Dugléré
Auguste Escoffier
Pierre Gagnaire
Michel Guérard
Victor Hirtzler
Marc Lanteri
Ludovic Lefebvre
Jacques Pépin
Georges Perrier
Fernand Point
Charles Ranhofer
Eric Ripert
Joël Robuchon
Albert Roux
Michel Roux
Michel Roux, Jr.
Julien Royer
Guy Savoy
Paul Thalamas
François Vatel
Marc Veyrat
Jean-Georges Vongerichten
Philippe Etchebest
Hélène Darroze
Paul Pairet
Michel Sarran

Colonial administrators

Félix Éboué, Governor General of French Equatorial Africa
Pierre Savorgnan de Brazza, French Congo
Antoine de la Mothe Cadillac, Louisiana
Samuel de Champlain, New France
François Caron, first Governor of French territories of India
François Martin, Governor for French territories in India
Pierre Christoph Le Noir, Governor for French territories in India
Pierre Benoît Dumas, Governor for French territories in India
Bertrand-François Mahé de La Bourdonnais, French naval officer and administrator, in the service of the French East India Company.
Joseph François Dupleix, Governor for French territories in India
Lally-Tollendal, Governor for French territories in India
Marquis de Bussy-Castelnau, Governor for French territories in India
Louis Faidherbe, Senegal
Joseph Gallieni, Madagascar
Francis Garnier, French Indochina (Vietnam, Cambodia, and Laos)
Émile Gentil, French Congo
Louis Hubert Gonzalve Lyautey, Algeria
Jean-Baptiste Le Moyne de Bienville, Louisiana
Jean Talon, Canada

Composers

Craftspeople and inventors

André Charles Boulle, cabinet maker
Louis Braille, blind inventor
Charles Cros, poet and inventor
Paul Héroult, inventor
Claude de Jouffroy d'Abbans, designed the first steamship in 1783
René François Lacôte, luthier
René Lalique, glass designer
Marie-Anne Leroudier, embroiderer 
Auguste and Louis Lumière, inventors
Benoît Raclet, inventor
Philippe Starck, industrial architect and designer
Franky Zapata, inventor of flyboard and flyboard Air

Criminals
For collaboration with Nazi Germany see also the politicians section.

Jacques de Bernonville (1897–1972), war criminal sentenced to death
Jules Bonnot
Émile Louis
Henri Désiré Landru, serial killer
Jacques Mesrine
Zacarias Moussaoui
Maurice Papon, politician and war criminal
Marcel Petiot, serial killer
Gilles de Rais, prolific serial killer
Jean-Claude Romand, murderer
Albert Spaggiari
Charles Sobhraj, killer
Paul Touvier, one of only two Frenchmen to be convicted of crimes against humanity

Dancers

Jane Avril
La Goulue
Sylvie Guillem
Marcelle Lender
Cléo de Mérode
Antonine Meunier
Hellé Nice
François Perron
Roland Petit
Les Twins, Larry and Laurent Bourgeois

Economists

Antoine Augustin Cournot
Maurice Allais, Nobel Prize
Raymond Barre, economist and politician
Frédéric Bastiat
Fernand Braudel
Alexandre Cazeau de Roumillac
Jules Dupuit
Gérard Debreu, Nobel memorial prize 1983
Charles Gide
Dominique Guellec
Achille-Nicolas Isnard, political economist and engineer
Jean-Jacques Laffont
Pierre Émile Levasseur
Alain Lipietz, green economist
Bernard Maris
Thomas Piketty
Pierre Samuel du Pont de Nemours
François Quesnay
Pascal Salin
Jean-Baptiste Say
Jean Tirole
Turgot
Léon Walras

Fashion

Christian Audigier, fashion designer and business man
Liliane Bettencourt, majority owner of L'Oréal, one of the wealthiest people in Europe
Pierre Cardin, fashion designer
Laetitia Casta, model
Coco Chanel, fashion designer
Jean-Charles de Castelbajac
Hubert de Givenchy
Inès de La Fressange, model and fashion designer
Christian Dior, fashion designer
Morgane Dubled, model
Julien Fournié
Jean Paul Gaultier
Daniel Hechter, inventor of ready-to-wear
Christian Lacroix
Jeanne Lanvin, fashion designer
Noémie Lenoir, model
Christian Louboutin, shoe designer
Iris Mittenaere, model, Miss France 2016 and Miss Universe 2016
Jennifer Messelier, model
Claude Montana
Thierry Mugler
Paul Poiret
Nina Ricci, fashion designer
Sonia Rykiel
Yves Saint Laurent, fashion designer
Hedi Slimane
Louis Vuitton, fashion designer

Filmmakers

Mona Achache
Olivier Assayas
Jacques Audiard
Jacques Becker
Jean-Jacques Beineix
Luc Besson
Yves Billon
Alice Guy-Blaché
Bertrand Blier
Patrick Bokanowski
Bertrand Bonello
Catherine Breillat
Robert Bresson
Laurent Cantet
Yves Caumon
André Cayatte
Claude Chabrol
Jean-Paul Civeyrac
René Clair
René Clément
Henri-Georges Clouzot
Jean Cocteau
Fabien Cousteau
Jacques Cousteau
Jacques Demy
Claire Denis
Arnaud Desplechin
Henri Diamant-Berger
Abel Gance
Jean-Luc Godard
Michel Gondry
Michel Hazanavicius
Jean-Pierre Jeunet
Mathieu Kassovitz
Jan Kounen
Patrice Leconte
Claude Lelouch
Philippe Lioret
Louis Malle
André Malraux
Georges Méliès
Jean-Pierre Melville
Maurice Pialat
Jean Renoir
Alain Resnais
Jacques Rivette
Yves Robert
Éric Rohmer
Jean Rollin
Alain Sarde
Claude Sautet
Ramzi Ben Sliman
Straub-Huillet
Jacques Tati
Jacques Tourneur
Maurice Tourneur
François Truffaut
Roger Vadim
Agnès Varda
Flore Vasseur
Jean Vigo

Humorists

Alain Chabat
Coluche
Pierre Dac, humorist and Resistance worker
Jamel Debbouze
Pierre Desproges
Raymond Devos
Gad Elmaleh
Florence Foresti
Thierry Le Luron
Dieudonné M'bala M'bala
Elie Semoun
Cabu
Stef and Jim

Military leaders

Monarchs and royals

Musicians

A–J

Dominique A
Air (band)
Alizée
Charles Aznavour
Josephine Baker, American-born entertainer
Thomas Bangalter, member of Daft Punk
Jane Bathori, opera singer
Barbara
Guy Béart
Bénabar
Michel Berger
Didier Bocquet
Pierre Bouvier
Lucienne Boyer
Georges Brassens
Breakbot
Aristide Bruant
Julie Budet
Manu Chao
Sébastien Charlier
Matthieu Chedid
Richard Clayderman, pianist
Chuck Comeau
Marie-Anne Couperin
Dalida
Damia
Claude Debussy
David Desrosiers
Natalie Dessay, opera singer
Dimitri from Paris
Sacha Distel, heartthrob: covered "Raindrops Keep Fallin' on My Head"
Marie Dubas
Jacques Dutronc
Kenza Farah
Mylène Farmer
Jean Ferrat
Léo Ferré
Nino Ferrer
Thomas Fersen
Claude François, popular singer during the 1960s and 1970s
Fréhel
Charlotte Gainsbourg
Serge Gainsbourg
France Gall
Laurent Garnier
Gipsy Kings
Georgius
Gesaffelstein
Jean-Jacques Goldman
Stéphane Grappelli, jazz musician
Juliette Gréco
Gribouille (born Marie-France Gaîté)
Hélène Grimaud, classical pianist
David Guetta, house-music producer and DJ
Yvette Guilbert
Arthur H
David Hallyday
Johnny Hallyday, born in Belgium, served in the French Army
Françoise Hardy
Jacques Higelin
Guy-Manuel de Homem-Christo, member of Daft Punk
Indila
Sébastien Izambard, member of the quartet Il Divo
IAM
Joëlle
Justice (band)

K–Z

Patricia Kaas
Kassav'
Kavinsky
Rina Ketty
Kiki, "Queen of Montparnasse"
La Goulue
Larusso
Boby Lapointe
Bernard Lavilliers
Maxime Le Forestier
Sébastien Lefebvre
Gérard Lenorman
Nolwenn Leroy
Lilly Wood and the Prick
Claudine Longet
Didier Lucchesi
Sheryfa Luna
M83
Madeon
Christophe Maé
Mano Negra
Luis Mariano
Anna Marly
Alain Marion
Didier Marouani, musician and composer
Mireille Mathieu
Félix Mayol
Miossec
Mireille
Mistinguett
Ginette Neveu
Yannick Noah
Claude Nougaro
NTM
Noir Désir
Vanessa Paradis
Pierre Perret
Michel Petrucciani
Édith Piaf
Michel Polnareff
Lily Pons, opera singer (naturalized as a United States citizen in 1940)
Rene Rancourt
Renaud
Tino Rossi
Jean Sablon
David Serero
Bob Sinclar
Skip the Use
Alain Souchon
Mano Solo
Jeff Stinco
Sébastien Tellier
Yann Tiersen
Charles Trenet
Christian Vander
Sylvie Vartan
Boris Vian
Pauline Viardot, opera singer and composer
Pedro Winter
Zazie

Philosophers

Pierre Abélard
Louis Althusser
Raymond Aron, sociologist and philosopher
Jean le Rond d'Alembert
Gaston Bachelard
Georges Bataille
Roland Barthes
Jean Baudrillard, philosopher and sociologist
Pierre Bourdieu, sociologist
Julien Benda
Henri Bergson
Émile Boutroux
Fabienne Brugère
Michel de Certeau
André Comte-Sponville
Jean de Crèvecœur
Guy Debord
Gilles Deleuze
Natalie Depraz
Jacques Derrida
René Descartes, scientist and philosopher
Denis Diderot, Enlightenment author and deist philosopher
Frantz Fanon
Michel Foucault
Camille Froidevaux-Metterie
Édouard Glissant
Félix Guattari
Vladimir Jankélévitch
Étienne de La Boétie, philosopher and politician
Philippe Lacoue-Labarthe
Henri Lefèbvre
Marcel Légaut, Christian philosopher
Jean de Léry, corsaire and ethnologist, anti-racism activist
Emmanuel Lévinas
Jean-François Lyotard
Nicolas Malebranche
Gabriel Marcel, philosopher
Jacques Maritain, philosopher
Maurice Merleau-Ponty, phenomenologist
Michel de Montaigne, philosopher essayist
Montesquieu, political philosopher
Edgar Morin
Emmanuel Mounier, philosopher
Jean-Luc Nancy, philosopher
Blaise Pascal, scientist, mathematician, Christian philosopher, and author
Jean-François Revel
Paul Ricœur
Jean-Jacques Rousseau
Jean-Paul Sartre, existentialist philosopher
Michel Serres
François-Marie Arouet (Voltaire), Enlightenment author, deist/agnostic philosopher
Éric Weil, philosopher
Simone Weil

Politicians

Robert Badinter, lawyer, statesman and anti-death-sentence activist
François Bayrou, UDF party leader
Léon Blum, politician, Socialist party leader, prime minister
José Bové, anti-globalization activist, altermondialist
Aristide Briand
Jacques Chirac, politician, member of center-right wing party, former city mayor of Paris, two-term French president
Georges Clemenceau
Gaspard de Coligny
Bertrand Delanoë, mayor of Paris
Jacques Delors
Félix Faure, President of France who died of a heart attack while making love to his mistress
Charles de Gaulle, World War II general, commander of the Free French Forces, heroic French president
Valéry Giscard d'Estaing
François Guizot, Prime Minister
Gisèle Halimi, lawyer and feminist activist
François Hollande, former PS (Socialist Party) leader, former French president (15 May 2012 – 14 May 2017)
Jean Jaurès, politician, pacifist
Lionel Jospin, socialist, former prime minister
Bernard Kouchner, founder of Médecins du Monde
Jean-Marie Le Pen, leader of the extreme right party in France, Front National, presidential candidate
Louis Lépine, Paris police chief, governor of Algiers, founder of the Concours Lépine
Émile Loubet, President of France who was elected in 1899, after the death of Félix Faure
Henri-Auguste Lozé, Paris police chief, senator of the Third Republic
Emmanuel Macron, founder and current President of Renaissance, current President of France (from 14 May 2017)
Jean-Paul Marat, politician during the Revolution, journalist, physician, scientist
Jean-Claude Martinez, lawyer and European deputy
Pierre Mendès France, lawyer and statesman, prime minister
Honoré Mirabeau
François Mitterrand, lawyer and statesman, president
Jean Monnet
Philippe Pétain, head of Vichy France
Alexandre de Prouville, Viceroy of New France
Marthe Richard
Maximilien Robespierre, statesman and major figure in the French Revolution
Gilberte Roca (1911–2004), Communist
Ségolène Royal, politician, Socialist party, presidential candidate
Nicolas Sarkozy, politician, President of the right wing party
Victor Schœlcher, anti-slavery activist
Charles Maurice de Talleyrand
Maurice Thorez
Jacques Toubon
Dominique de Villepin, former Prime Minister of France
Dominique Voynet, physician and Green party politician

Popes

Resistance workers
Resistance workers during the German occupation of France in World War II

Lucie Samuel-Aubrac (1912–2007), human rights activist
Raymond Aubrac (1914–2012), statesman
Robert Benoist (1895–1944), SOE operative, champion race car driver
Denise Bloch (1915–1945), SOE operative: King's Commendation for Brave Conduct, Legion of Honor, French Resistance Medal
Andrée Borrel (1919–1944), SOE operative: Croix de guerre
Bernadette Cattanéo (1899–1963), trade unionist and communist activist 
Madeleine Damerment (1917–1944), SOE operative: Legion of Honor, Croix de guerre, Médaille combattant volontaire de la Résistance
Marie Louise Dissard (1880–1957), U.S. Presidential Medal of Freedom recipient
William Grover-Williams (1903–1945), SOE operative, champion race car driver
Cecily Lefort (1900–1945), SOE operative: Croix de guerre
Pierre Mendès France (1907–1982), lawyer, statesman
Jean Moulin (1899–1943), statesman
Agnès de La Barre de Nanteuil (1922–1944), assisted allied airmen
Abbé Pierre (1912–2007), priest and founder of Emmaus
Christian Pineau (1904–1995), statesman
Eliane Plewman (1917–1944), SOE operative: Croix de guerre
Germaine Ribière (1917–1999), Righteous among the Nations
Élise Rivet (1890–1945), nun executed by Nazis for aiding the resistance
Lilian Rolfe (1914–1945), SOE agent executed by the Nazis
Odette Sansom (1912–1995), SOE operative: George Cross, MBE, Legion of Honor
Suzanne Spaak, Belgian-born agent: "Red Orchestra" intelligence network; executed 1944
Violette Szabo (1921–1945), SOE operative: George Cross, Croix de guerre
Jean-Pierre Wimille (1908–1949), SOE operative, champion race car driver

See also French Resistance

Scientists

Social activists

Hubertine Auclert, journalist and feminist leader
Simone de Beauvoir, author, philosopher, and feminist
Christian de Boisredon, social activist 
Sophie de Condorcet, feminist
Maria Deraismes, feminist
Camille Drevet, anti-colonialist, feminist and pacifist activist
Marguerite Durand, journalist and feminist leader
Anna Féresse-Deraismes feminist activist
Olympe de Gouges, feminist
Floresca Guépin, feminist and teacher
Alice Jouenne, educator and socialist activist
Samir Kassir, journalist
Jean Théophile Victor Leclerc, radical revolutionist, newspaper publisher
Marie Léopold-Lacour, feminist activist, writer, and storyteller
Félix Pécaut, education proponent and pastor
Gabrielle Petit, feminist activist, anticlerical, libertarian socialist, newspaper editor
Élisabeth Renaud, teacher, socialist activist, feminist
Colette Reynaud, feminist, socialist, pacifist, journalist
Victor Schœlcher, abolitionist
Pierre Seel, homosexual concentration camp survivor, activist, author
Séverine, feminist
Madeleine Tribolati (1905–1995), trade unionist
Flora Tristan, feminist

Soldiers

Joan of Arc, commander and saint
Chevalier Bayard
François Achille Bazaine
Jean-Baptiste Bernadotte
Georges Boulanger
Thomas Robert Bugeaud
Raymond H. A. Carter
François de Charette
Louis II de Bourbon, Prince of Condé, known as le Grand Condé.
Gaspard de Coligny
François Darlan
Louis-Nicolas Davout
Bob Denard
Alfred Dreyfus
Charles François Dumouriez
Ferdinand Foch
Louis Franchet d'Espèrey
Joseph Gallieni
Maurice Gamelin
Henri Gouraud
Bertrand du Guesclin
Joseph Joffre
Edmond Jouhaud
Jean-Baptiste Jourdan
Alphonse Juin
Marie-Pierre Kœnig
Jacques de la Palice
Marquis de Lafayette
Charles Leclerc
Jean Lannes
Jean de Lattre de Tassigny
Philippe Leclerc de Hauteclocque
François-Henri de Montmorency, duc de Luxembourg
Hubert Lyautey
Patrice MacMahon
Charles Mangin
Claude Martin
André Masséna
Jacques Massu
Louis-Joseph de Montcalm
Simon de Montfort
Philippe Morillon
Toussaint-Guillaume Picquet de la Motte
Joachim Murat
Michel Ney
Robert Nivelle
Philippe Pétain
Comte de Rochambeau
Raoul Salan
Maurice Sarrail
Nicolas Soult
Louis Jules Trochu
Henri de Turenne
Étienne de Vignolles, called La Hire
Claude Louis Hector de Villars
Maxime Weygand

Theologians
O.P. (Ordo Praedicatorum) is the abbreviation used to indicate that someone is/was a member of the Dominican order, a Catholic religious order.
S.J. (Societas Iesu) is the abbreviation used to indicate that someone is/was a member of the Society of Jesus, another Catholic religious order.

Jean Arnauld, philosopher and theologian
Denis Bérardier, priest and theologian
Marie-Émile Boismard O.P.
Jacques-Bénigne Bossuet
Jean Calvin
Sebastian Castellio, translator of the Bible
Pierre Cauchon, condemned Joan of Arc
Robert Ciboule, Roman Catholic theologian
Bernard of Clairvaux
Jean Claude
Yves Congar, O.P.
Reginald Garrigou-Lagrange, O.P.
Hubert Languet
Maurice Leenhardt, ethnologist, theologian
Jean Louail, theologian
André Paul, scholar in the fields of theology, biblical studies and ancient Judaism
François Picquet, 18th-century missionary in New France
Jean Porthaise, theologian
Alexander de Rhodes S.J., 17th-century missionary to Indochina
Richard of Saint-Laurent, canon at Rouen
Auguste Sabatier
Antonin Sertillanges O.P., founder of the Revue ThomistePierre Teilhard de Chardin S.J.
Simon-Michel Treuvé

Others

Marie-Louise Arconati-Visconti (1840–1923), art collector, philanthropist
Fabrice Balanche, geographer
Marcel Bardiaux, sailor
Suzanne Borel, first French woman diplomat
Jeanne Calment, title claimant for the longest documented human lifespan – 122 years and 164 days
Pierre de Coubertin, initiator of the modern Olympic Games
Jean Crépin, Army general
Ninon de l'Enclos, courtesan, patron of the arts
Cavalier de la Salle, explorer
Maurice Debesse, educator
Suzanne Deutsch de la Meurthe, philanthropist, aviation supporter
René Dumont, agronomist engineer and sociologist and ecology activist
Jules Dumont d'Urville
Maurice Duverger, jurist
Gustave Eiffel, engineer
Pierre Charles L'Enfant, city planner responsible for Washington, D.C.
Charles-Michel de l'Épée, founder of world's first public school for deaf people
Norbert Ferré, illusionist
Robert Gloton, educator
Arthur de Gobineau, diplomat, author of An Essay on the Inequality of the Human Races''
Lucie Grange, medium and feminist prophet
Marie de Hennezel, psychologist, psychotherapist and writer
Daniel Le Hirbec, navigator
Louis Maurice Adolphe Linant de Bellefonds, explorer and canal engineer
Marie-Antoinette Lix, governess and resistance fighter
Brigitte Macron, high school teacher, first lady of France
Virginie Mauvais, educator, philanthropist
Philippe Méaille, contemporary art collector
Montgolfier brothers, balloonists
François Henri de la Motte, French spy executed for treason 1781 in London
Nostradamus, physician, author, translator, astrological consultant
Charles François Adrien le Paulmier, diplomat, nobleman, and slaveholder
Anne Quemere, sailor and sportswoman
Jean-Marie Raoul, lawyer, musician 
Élisée Reclus, geographer and anarchist
Jean-François Ricard (born 1956), prosecutor of the French National Terrorism Prosecution Office
Jean Eugène Robert-Houdin, magician, namesake of "Harry Houdini"
Pierre Seel, homosexual survivor of the concentration camps, activist, author
Odette Teissier du Cros (1906–1997), ethnologist, museum curator
Vauban, engineer
Eugène François Vidocq, French convict-turned-spy considered the father of modern forensics

See also

List of French Jews
List of French people of immigrant origin
List of people by nationality: Belgians, Catalans, Monégasque people, Quebecers, Swiss

References